Ctenucha vittigerum is a moth of the family Erebidae. It was described by Émile Blanchard in 1852 and is found in Chile and Argentina.

References

vittigerum
Moths described in 1852